Streptomyces glycovorans is a bacterium species from the genus of Streptomyces which has been isolated from marine sediments of the South China Sea near the Xisha Islands in China.

See also 
 List of Streptomyces species

References

Further reading

External links
Type strain of Streptomyces glycovorans at BacDive -  the Bacterial Diversity Metadatabase

glycovorans
Bacteria described in 2012